Bruce Barthol (November 11, 1947 – February 20, 2023) was an American bass player.

Born at Alta Bates Hospital, Berkeley, California, he was the original bass player with Country Joe and the Fish through to November 1968. Staying on in England after a European tour eventually led to the formation of Formerly Fat Harry with Gary Peterson and fellow Berkeley native, and one time denizen of The Jabberwock, Phil Greenberg. Upon his return to the Bay Area in 1972, Barthol formed Energy Crisis with some ex-members of the Cleanliness and Godliness Skiffle Band before becoming the musical director for the Tony Award winning San Francisco Mime Troupe in 1976. From 2004 to 2006, Barthol joined ex-Country Joe and the Fish members Joe McDonald, David Bennett Cohen and Chicken Hirsh for a number of short tours of the United States and the UK. Retirement from the San Francisco Mime Troupe came in 2009 together with the release with an acclaimed solo album The Decline and Fall of Everything. He has also written for the San Francisco Shakespeare Festival and the Oberlin Dance Company.  Barthol was also the bass player with the Former Members who include Greg Douglass, Roy Blumenfeld and David Bennett Cohen in their line-up. He held an MFA in Musical Theater from New York University.

Barthol died on February 20, 2023, at the age of 75.

Sources
 Country Joe's Place

References

External links
 
 

1947 births
2023 deaths
American musical theatre composers
American rock bass guitarists
American musical theatre lyricists
Musicians from Berkeley, California
Country Joe and the Fish members
Songwriters from California
Guitarists from California
American male bass guitarists
20th-century American bass guitarists
Classical musicians from California
20th-century American male musicians
American male songwriters